Vernor may refer to:

Places
Vernor, Queensland, a locality of the Somerset Region in Queensland, Australia

Names
James Vernor, an American pharmacist
Vernor Vinge, a science fiction author
Vernors, an American soft drink